The ANFA National League Cup or Nepal National League Cup is a knockout association football competition in men's domestic Nepalese football. It is organised by the All Nepal Football Association, and serves as a qualification tournament for the Asian Cup Winners' Cup.

After the 1999 edition, the National League Cup was postponed indefinitely. Since then, the Khukuri Gold Cup attempted to revive the format, with the 2004 season seeing 425 clubs participating in the cup tournament.

Editions
1985 ANFA League Cup – New Road Team
1986 ANFA League Cup – Unknown
1987 ANFA League Cup – Unknown
1988 ANFA League Cup – Unknown
1989 ANFA League Cup – Unknown
1997 ANFA League Cup – Tribhuvan Army Club
1998 ANFA League Cup – Mahendra Police Club
1999 ANFA League Cup – Mahendra Police Club

References

Football competitions in Nepal
1985 establishments in Nepal